Brachycoleus decolor  is a species of plant-feeding insects of the family Miridae.

Description
These relatively large true bugs have a short and wide head. Body is covered with yellowish fine hairs. Legs are yellowish-orange. Pronotum and hemelytra show distinct longitudinal black markings on a pale yellow or green background.

Distribution
This species is present in Russia, Austria, France, Germany, Italy, Macedonia, Poland, Siberia and Central Asia, Turkestan and  Turkey.

Habitat

Biology
These true bugs maily feed on Apiaceae, especially on parsnip (Pastinaca sativa), field eryngo (Eryngium campestre) and Peucedanum species. This species can be found, however, on spurge (Euphorbia spec.) and knapweeds (Centaurea spec.). Adults can be seen in June and July.

References

External links
 Koleopterologie.de

Hemiptera of Europe
Insects described in 1887
Mirini